Biswasghatak is a 1974 Bengali novel by Narayan Sanyal based on the events related to the Atomic Bomb under the Manhattan Project.

Synopsis 
The Bengali term biswasghatak literally means 'traitor'. After the end of the Second World War, a scientist, Klaus Fuchs, supplied confidential information to the USSR on his own efforts by averting the ever alert eyes of the United States Government. In the history of mankind this is supposed to be the biggest treason in terms of economic evaluation.

External links
 Biswasghatak in archive.org

References

Novels by Narayan Sanyal
1974 Indian novels
Novels set during World War II
Indian Bengali-language novels